The Leyden Trophy is awarded to the regular season champion of the East division in the Ontario Hockey League. The award was first presented in 1975–76 to the winners of the Leyden division. The league realigned into three divisions for 1994–95, and the award has since been presented to the East Division.

It is named in honour of Matt Leyden, a former president of the Ontario Hockey Association, and long-time general manager of the Oshawa Generals. Leyden established the Generals dynasty that won seven consecutive J. Ross Robertson Cups and three Memorial Cups between 1937 and 1944.

Winners
List of winners of the Leyden Trophy.

References

External links
 Ontario Hockey League

Ontario Hockey League trophies and awards
Awards established in 1976